Sverre Gjørvad (born 26 October 1966 in Stathelle, Norway) is a Norwegian jazz musician (drums) and composer. He is known for participating in establishing the SoddJazz festival and recording with various notable musicians including Live Maria Roggen, Ståle Storløkken, Mats Eilertsen and Nils-Olav Johansen.

Career 
Gjørvad studied jazz at Trondheim Musikkonservatorium, while performing with Bodega Band and Storytellers, with Nils-Olav Johansen (guitar) and Svein Folkvord (bass). Storytellers released their album Enjoy Storytellers! in 1994. He has performed with Dingobats, along with Eirik Hegdal (saxophone), Njål Ølnes (saxophone), Thomas T. Dahl (guitar), and Mats Eilertsen (bass). As regional musician in Nord-Trøndelag, Gjørvad taught music and composed the work Jazz Pathetique for the SoddJazz festival in 1999.

In 2006, Gjørvad moved to Hammerfest, where he currently works as producer for the Arctic Cultural Centre. He also leads his own quartet, doing occasional concerts and tours around Norway.

Discography

Solo albums 
 2001: Denne lille pytten er et hav (Curling Legs), texts by Jan Kjærstad (Forføren and Speil) and novels by Peter Handke, which featured Live Maria Roggen (vocals), Ståle Storløkken (keyboards), Nils-Olav Johansen (guitar), Mats Eilertsen (bass), and Øyvind Brekke (trombone).
 2011: Patience For The Little Things (Reflect Records), with Siri Gjære, Ståle Storløkken, Mark Fransman, Brydon Bolton, Gorm Helfjord, and Melanie Scholtz.
 2019: Voi River (Losen Records), with Herborg Rundberg, Kristian Olstad and Dag Okstad.
 2020: Elegy of Skies (Losen Records), with Herborg Rundberg, Kristian Olstad, Dag Okstad and Joakim Milder.
 2021: Time To Illuminate Earth (Losen Records), with Herborg Rundberg, Kristian Olstad, Dag Okstad and Embrik Snerte.
 2022: Here Comes The Sun (Losen Records), with Herborg Rundberg, Kristian Olstad, Dag Okstad and Eirik Hegdal.

Collaborations 
With Epinastic Movements
 1994: Rapid (Pop Eye)

With Storytellers
 1994: Enjoy Storytellers! (Curling Legs)

With Dingobats
 1998: The New Dingobats Generation (Turn Left Productions)
 2002: Pöck (Bergland Productions)
 2004: Follow (Jazzaway Records)

With Kjellerbandet
 1999: Kjellerbandet På Plate

With Richard Badendyck
 2004: That's All (Jazzavdelingen)

With Jienat
 2010: Mira (Jienat)

With Ivar Thomassen
 2011: Særlig Når Timan E Blå (Reflect)

With Håkon Follien
 2019: Prærien Super (Tyven Records)

References 

Musicians from Stathelle
Norwegian University of Science and Technology alumni
20th-century Norwegian drummers
21st-century Norwegian drummers
Norwegian jazz drummers
Male drummers
Norwegian composers
Norwegian male composers
1966 births
Living people
20th-century drummers
20th-century Norwegian male musicians
21st-century Norwegian male musicians
Male jazz musicians
Storytellers (Norwegian band) members